Halla , is a town and Union Council situated near Pattoki in Pattoki Tehsil of Kasur District in the Punjab province of Pakistan. It is located at 31°7'9N 73°43'24E with an altitude of 178 metres (587 feet).  It is located on bank of Lower Bari Doaab.

References

Kasur District